The Embassy of Ukraine in Lima is the diplomatic mission of Ukraine in Peru. The current ambassador of Ukraine to Peru is Yuriy Polyukhovych.

The embassy is also accredited to Colombia and Ecuador.

History
Peru recognized the independence of Ukraine on December 26, 1991. Diplomatic relations between the two countries were then established on May 7, 1992. The embassy was inaugurated in October 2003.

In 2022, messages of support were placed outside of the embassy by locals in response to the Russian invasion of Ukraine.

See also
List of ambassadors of Ukraine to Peru
List of diplomatic missions of Ukraine

References

Peru
Ukraine
Peru–Ukraine relations